The Western Turkic Khaganate or Onoq Khaganate  was a Turkic khaganate in Eurasia, formed as a result of the wars in the beginning of the 7th century (593–603 CE) after the split of the First Turkic Khaganate (founded in the 6th century on the Mongolian Plateau by the Ashina clan), into a western and an eastern Khaganate.

The whole confederation was called Onoq, meaning "ten arrows". According to a Chinese source, the Western Turks were organized into ten divisions.

The khaganate's capitals were Navekat (summer capital) and Suyab (principal capital), both situated in the Chui River valley of Kyrgyzstan, to the east of Bishkek. Tong Yabgu's summer capital was near Tashkent and his winter capital Suyab.

The Western Turkic Khaganate was subjugated by the Tang dynasty in 657 and continued as its vassal, until it finally collapsed in 742.

History

The first Turkic Khaganate was founded by Bumin in 552 on the Mongolian Plateau and quickly spread west toward the Caspian Sea. Within 35 years the western half and the Eastern Turkic Khaganate were independent. The Western Khaganate reached its peak under Tong Yabghu Qaghan (618–630). After Tong's murder there were conflicts between the Dulu and Nushibi factions and many short-lived Khagans, and some territory was lost. From 642 onward the expanding Tang dynasty began to interfere. The Tang destroyed the Khaganate in 657–659.

Western expansion (552–575 CE)

The Gokturks and Mongols were the only two empires to rule both the eastern and central steppe. The Gokturks were the first steppe empire to be in contact with three great urban civilizations: Byzantium, Persia and China. Their expansion west from modern-day Mongolia is poorly documented. Lev Gumilyov gives the following. Bumin gave the west to his younger brother Istami (553–75). The campaign probably began in the spring of 554 and apparently met little resistance. They took Semirechye and by 555 had reached the Aral Sea, probably on a line from the lower Oxus, across the Jaxartes, north of Tashkent to the western tip of the Tian Shan. They drove before them various peoples: Xionites, Uar, Oghurs and others. These seem to have merged into the Avars whom the Gokturks drove across the Volga River in 558, and who crossed the western steppe and reached Hungary by 567. The Turks then turned southeast.

At this time the Hephthalites held the Tarim Basin , Fergana, Sogdia, Bactria and Merv, with the Persians at approximately their present border.  Khosrow I made peace with the Byzantines and turned on the Hephthalites. Fighting started in 560  The Persians won a victory in 562, and the Turks took Tashkent. In 565, the Hephthalites were defeated at Qarshi and withdrew to Bactria, where fragments of this people remained until the Arab conquest. The Turks demanded the tribute formerly paid to the Hephthalites and when this was refused, they crossed the Oxus, but thought better of it and withdrew. In 571 a border was drawn along the Oxus, the Persians expanding east to Afghanistan, while the Turks gain the Sogdian merchant cities and their control of the Silk Road.

Around 567–576  the Turks took the area between the Caspian and Black Seas. In 568 they took part of Bactria.

Late period (575–630 CE)
Istami was followed by his son Tardush (575–603). About 581 he intervened in the eastern Gokturk civil war. In 588/89 the Turks were defeated by Persians near Herat in the First Perso-Turkic War. In 599–603 he gained the eastern half of the Khaganate, but after his death the two halves were definitely split.  Heshana Khagan (603–611) was driven out of Dzungaria and then defeated by Sheguy (610–617), Tardush's grandson, who conquered the Altai, reconquered Tashkent and raided Ishfahan.

Yabghus of Tokharistan and Turk Shahis

His brother Tong Yabghu Qaghan (618–630) ruled from the Tarim basin to the Caspian Sea, and met Xuanzang.  He sent men to fight the Persians south of the Caucasus, and also sent his son Tardush Shad to fight in Afghanistan, where he established the Yabghus of Tokharistan, who themselves projected the Turk Shahis as far east as India.

In the year of Tong's death the Tang dynasty defeated and annexed the Eastern Khaganate. He was murdered by his uncle Külüg Sibir (630) with Duolu support. The Nushibi put Tong's son Sy Yabgu (631–33) on the throne. However, Nushibi quickly rebelled against Sy and enthroned Ashina Nishu as Duolu Khan (633–34), followed by his brother Ishbara Tolis (634–38). There was a Dulu-Nushibi conflict and Yukuk Shad (638–42), son of the final eastern Khagan, was brought in.

The factions quarreled and the Nushibi and Emperor Taizong of Tang enthroned Irbis Seguy (642–51). The Tang dynasty demanded part of the Tarim Basin and then seized part of it until the war ended with Taizong's death. Irbis was overthrown by (Ashina Helu) Ishbara Qaghan (651–58) who, after about six years of war, was defeated at Battle of Irtysh River and captured by the Tang. After this there were several puppet Khagans. In 679–719 the old Gokturk capital of Suyab was one of the Four Garrisons of Anxi. The Tang dynasty exercised control over the area until the time of An Lushan's rebellion (756).

Tang campaigns against the Western Turks (640–657 CE)

The Tang campaigns against the Western Turks, were a series of military campaigns conducted during the Tang dynasty against the Western Turkic Khaganate in the 7th century CE. Early military conflicts were a result of the Tang interventions in the rivalry between the Western and Eastern Turks in order to weaken both. Under Emperor Taizong, campaigns were dispatched in the Western Regions against Gaochang in 640, Karasahr in 644 and 648, and Kucha in 648.

The wars against the Western Turks continued under Emperor Gaozong, and the khaganate was annexed after General Su Dingfang's defeat of Qaghan Ashina Helu in 657.

Tang protectorate (657–742 CE)
The Western Turks attempted to capture the Tarim Basin in 670 and 677, but were repelled by the Tang. In 679, the Tang general Pei Xingjian led an army as far as Tokharistan, as he was also escorting back to Persia the last Sasanian pretender to the throne, Narsieh. Pei Xingjian fought successfully against an invasion of Anxi led by Western Turkic Khan Ashina Duzhi, and numerous minor Turkic chieftains in the region then pledged their loyalty to the Tang dynasty. Meanwhile, general Pei Xingjian lost interest in reinstalling the Persian King and left Narsieh in the Anxi Protectorate alone, although Narsieh was still able to maintain his many servants and a high quality of life, and would continue on to fight against the Muslim Arabs for twenty years. Upon returning to Tang, Pei was appointed the minister of rituals and Great general of the right flank guards.

In 679, Turkic chieftain Ashide Wenfu rebelled. Protectorate general Xiao Siye, a noble from Lanling Commandery, was defeated by Ashide. Pei then took over the command from Xiao and decisively won a battle against the Turks in an ambush. Ashide fled. Not long after the first defeat, Ashide Wenfu gathered his troops and united them with the troops of another chieftain Ashina Funian. Pei saw the distrust and suspicions between the two chieftains and exploited this weakness by driving a wedge between them. Eventually, Ashina Funian murdered Ashide Wenfu out of the fear of Tang's revenge against him. When Funian was brought to the Tang court, he was executed regardless of the fact that he surrendered his troops. Pei had promised Ashina that he would not be put to death, however, the court did not respect Pei's promise. Due to this incident, Pei retired. Ashina's death, according to New Book of Tang, was a scheme against Pei Xingjian by his very own clansman Pei Yan who was jealous about his victories in the West.

In 682, Pei was again put in charge of pacifying yet another Turkic rebellion against the Tang dynasty. However, he died of old age before the troops were sent out. The imperial court rewarded him the posthumous name Xian (獻) which means "Dedication", as well as the supreme military honorary title Taiwei (太尉).

The areas controlled by the Tang dynasty came under the dynasty's cultural influences and the Turkic influence of the ethnically Turkic Tang soldiers stationed in the region. Indo-European prevalence in Central Asia declined as the expeditions accelerated Turkic migration into what is now Xinjiang. By the end of the 657 campaign, the Tang had reached its largest extent. The Turks, Tibetans, Muslim Arabs and the Tang competed for control over Central Asia until the collapse of the Tang in the 10th century.

The Second Turkic Empire defeated the fragmented Western Turks in 712, and absorbed the tribes into the new empire.

Relations with the Persians and Byzantines

During the late 6th century, the Turks consolidated their geopolitical position in Central Asia, as the lynchpin in trade between East Asia and Western Asia – in which Persia and Byzantium were the dominant powers. For much of this period, Istämi ruled the Khaganate from a winter camp near Karashar. A timeline of the westward expansion of the Turks under Istämi might be reconstructed as follows:
 552 Mongolia;
 555 Aral Sea (probably);
 558 Volga River (by defeating the Avars);
 557–565 in alliance with the Persians, the Turks crushed the Hephthalites, after which a Turco-Persian border along the Oxus lasted several decades; *564 Tashkent; 567–571 the North Caucasus;
 569–571 Turks at war with Persia;
 576 major incursion into the Black Sea area, including Crimea.

A first Turk legation (or embassy) to reach Constantinople visited Justin II in 563. A Sogdian merchant named  led a Turco-Sogdian legation to Constantinople in 568, pursuing trade and an alliance against the Avars and Persians. A Byzantine official named Zemarchus accompanied Maniakh on his return journey; and later left a pioneering account of the Turks. Maniakh now proposed to bypass the Persians and re-open a direct route north of the Caspian Sea. If trade on this route later increased (uncertain) it would have benefited Khorezm and the Black Sea cities and might have had something to do with the later rise of the Khazars and Rus' people.

The Turks' control of the Sogdian merchant cities along the Oxus from the late 6th century on gave the Western Turks substantive control of the central part of the Silk Road. A Chinese general complained that the:

Denis Sinor saw the Byzantine alliance as a Sogdian scheme to benefit themselves at the expense of the Turks. A related fact is that the Eastern Turks extracted a large amount of silk as booty from the Chinese, which had to be marketed westward.  Before 568, Maniakh, a leading merchant, visited the Sassanian Persian court, in a bid to open up trade; this proposal was refused, apparently because the Persians wanted to restrict trade by and with the Byzantines. The members of a second Turk legation to Persia were reportedly poisoned. From 569, the Turks and Persia were at war, until the Turks were defeated near Merv; hostilities ceased in 571.

In 576, Valentinus led a Byzantine mission  to a Turxanthos whose camp was west of the Caspian. Valentinus wanted action against the Persians and Turxanthos complained that Byzantium was harboring the Avars. Valentinus then went east to meet Tardu. What caused this hostility is not clear. In 576–77 a Turk general called Bokhan and an Utigur called Anagai captured the Crimean Byzantine town of Panticapaeum and failed at a siege of Chersonesus. This marks the westernmost extent of Turk power.

A major incursion into Bactria by the Turks, in 588–589, was defeated by the Sasanians.
The Turk-Byzantine alliance was revived in the 620s during the last great Byzantine-Persian war before the Arab conquests.  In 627 Tong Yabghu Qaghan sent out his nephew Böri Shad. The Turks stormed the great fortress of Derbent on the Caspian coast, entered Azerbaijan and Georgia, did a good bit of looting and met Heraclius who was besieging Tiflis. When the siege dragged on, the Turks left and Heraclius went south and won a great victory over the Persians. The Turks returned, captured Tiflis and massacred the garrison. On behalf of the Byzantines, a Turk general named Chorpan Tarkhan then conquered most of Armenia.

The Onoq or ten tribes

For the origin of the Onoq two contradicting accounts are given:

The first statement dates their origin back to the beginning of the First Turkic Qaghanate with Istämi, younger brother of Tumen (Bumen), who had brought with him the ten tribes, probably from the Eastern Qaghanate in Mongolia and travelled west to expand the Qaghanate. The exact date for the event was not recorded, and the shanyu here referred to might be Muhan Khan.

The second statement attributes it to Dielishi, who took over the throne in 635 and began to strengthen the state by further affirming the initial ten tribes and two tribal wings, in contrast with the rotation of rule between the Tumen (through Apa) and Istämi (through Tardu) lineages in the Western Qaghanate. Thereafter, the name "ten tribes" (十姓) became a shortened address for the Western Turks in Chinese records. Those divisions did not include the five major tribes, who were active further east of the ten tribes.

The earlier tribes consisted of eight primary tribes ruled by eight chiefs-in-command: the five Duolu (咄陆) tribes, and the three Nushibi (弩失毕) tribes. Syriac and Greek sources (John of Ephesus, Menander Protector) also confirmed that initially, the Western Turkic Khaganate were divided into eight tribes during Istämi's lifetime and at his death.

The ruling elites were divided into two groups and the relationship between the two groups were tense: the more aristocratic Duolu shads held the title churs, and the lower-ranking Nushibi in west were probably initially made up of Tiele conscripts and their shads held the title . During the reformation the more powerful Nushibi tribes such as A-Xijie and Geshu were sub-divided into two tribal groups with a greater and lesser title under a fixed tribal name, resulting in the attested On Oq & 十箭 shíjiàn "ten arrows").

Primary Sources

Afrasiab murals (7th century CE)

Turkic delegates appear together with Chinese envoys in the 7th century CE murals of Afrasiab in Samarkand. The Chinese delegates (left in the mural) form an embassy to the king of Samarkand,  carrying silk and a string of silkworm cocoons. The  Turkic delegates (right in the mural), are recognizable by their long plaits. They do not carry presents, as they are simply escorting the Chinese envoys.

The scenes depicted in the Afrasiyab murals may have been painted in 648–651 CE, as the Western Turkic Khaganate was in its last days, before its fall in 657 CE, and the Han Dynasty was increasing its territory in Central Asia. They are recognizable by their long plaits.

Ethnic and sartorial characteristics
In the mural, the Western Turks are ethnic Turks, Nushibis, rather than Turkicized Sogdians, as suggested by the marked Mongoloid features and faces without beards. They are the most numerous ethnic group in the mural, and are not ambassadors, but rather military attendants. Their depiction offers a unique glimpse into the clothing of the Turks of the 6–7th century CE. They typically wear three or five long long plaits, often gathered together into a one single long plait. They have ankle-length monochromic sleeved coats with two lapels. This fashion for the collar is first seen in Khotan near Turfan, a traditional Turkic land, in the 2nd–4th century CE. They have low black sharp-nosed boots. They wear gold bracelets with lapis lazuli or pearls. On Western Turkic coins, "the faces of the governor and governess are clearly mongoloid (a roundish face, narrow eyes), and the portrait have definite old Türk features (long hair, absence of headdress of the governor, a tricorn headdress of the governess)".

Orkhon Inscriptions 

Bilge Khagan inscription, main side, 16:

Bilge Khagan inscription, 1st side, 1:

Bilge Khagan inscription, 2nd side: 15:

Tonyukuk inscription 

Tonyukuk inscription, main side, 19:

Tonyukuk inscription, main side, 30:

Tonyukuk inscription, main side, 33:

Tonyukuk inscription, main side, 42–43:

Rulers of the Western Turkic Khaganate

Yabgus during the United Empire (553–603)

Khagans during the independent Western Khaganate (603–658)

Claimants
 El Kulug Shad 639–640 (Nushibi-chief)
 Irbis Ishbara Yabgu Qaghan 640–641 (Nushibi-chief)
Later claimants
 Ashina Duzhi 676–679 (allied with Tibetan Empire)
 Ashina Tuizi 693–700 (allied with Tibetan Empire)

Khagans under Tang suzerainty (657–742)

Kunling Protectorate (657–736)
 Ashina Mishe (657–662)
 Ashina Yuanqing (685–692)
 Ashina Xian (708–717)
 Ashina Zhen (735–736)
Mengchi Protectorate (657–742)
 Ashina Buzhen (657–667)
 Ashina Huseluo (693–704)
 Ashina Huaidao (704–708)
 Ashina Xin (740–742)

See also
 Eastern Turkic Khaganate
 Tang campaigns against the Western Turks
 Gao Changgong
 Qaghans of the Turkic khaganates
 History of the central steppe
 Khazars
 Oghuz Turks
 Turks in the Tang military
 Turkic interregnum
 Turkic peoples
 Timeline of Turks (500–1300)

Sources

References

Citations

Sources 

 Christoph Baumer, History of Central Asia, volume 2, pp. 174–206
 Lev Gumilyov, The Ancient Turks, 1967 (long account in Russian at: "Древние тюрки")
 

Ashina tribe
 
Nomadic groups in Eurasia
Khanates
581 establishments
Former countries in Chinese history
Historical transcontinental empires
Former empires